Corelli or Correlli may refer to:

People
Given name
 Correlli Barnett (born 1927), historian 
 Corelli C. W. Simpson (1837–1923), American poet, cookbook author, painter

Surname
Corelli (surname)
Arcangelo Corelli (1653–1713), Italian violinist and composer of Baroque music
Buba Corelli (1989 - ), Bosnian rapper, songwriter, producer and entrepreneur
Franco Corelli (1921–2003), Italian tenor
Marie Corelli (1855–1924), British novelist

Other uses
Correlli, an Australian television series

See also
Captain Corelli's Mandolin, a novel by British author Louis de Bernières
Captain Corelli's Mandolin (film), a 2001 film based on the novel